Michael Yo Simmons is an American actor, stand-up comedian, and television host who co-hosted The Insider on CBS, and currently hosts Yo Show on Yahoo! TV. Yo also appears regularly on the comedy panel of Chelsea Lately, as a guest host for The Talk on CBS, and as pop culture commentator on Showbiz Tonight. Michael played football for the University of Arkansas, but his football career was cut short due to multiple concussions.

His stand up special debut “Blasian” was released November 27, 2018. 

His film credits include Losing Control, The Cookout 2, and Sofia Coppola’s Bling Ring.

Career
Yo previously worked as a correspondent for E! News, The Daily 10, and Extra. He coached Kourtney and Khloé Kardashian as radio DJs for their show Kourtney & Khloé Take Miami on E!.

In 2001, he appeared in a season one episode of Fear Factor in which contestants had to free fall from a hotel window hundreds of feet high, eat sheep's eyes and hang upside down in a water tank.

He started a podcast together with comedian Jo Koy on July 23, 2012 called The Michael Yo and Jo Koy Show.

In November 2018, it was announced that his family comedy (inspired by his own life) was in development at Fox which he would star, co-write and produce.

On April 9, 2019, February 27, 2020, and May 12, 2020, Yo appeared on The Joe Rogan Experience.

He appeared on season 15 of America's Got Talent. Performing stand-up comedy, he received a yes from all 4 judges and advanced to the next round, but was eventually eliminated in the Quarter-Finals.

In 2022, he appeared on the Netflix baking competition Is It Cake? as a judge.

Personal life
Yo says that being a biracial person who is half black and half Asian, he has "a uniquely relatable and American experience in life". Yo said "Comedy is not about one-liners and punchlines, it's about story telling and a real connection with the audience."

References

External links
 
 

21st-century American comedians
American people of Korean descent
African-American male comedians
American male comedians
African-American television personalities
Living people
People from Houston
1974 births
America's Got Talent contestants
21st-century African-American people
20th-century African-American people